Ginásio Clube do Sul is a handball team based in Almada, Portugal, that plays in Liga Portuguesa de Andebol.

2006–07 squad

Portuguese handball clubs
Sport in Almada